Milad Sarlak (born 26 March 1995) is an Iranian professional footballer who plays as a defensive midfielder for Persian Gulf Pro League club Persepolis and Iran national team.

Club career

Sepahan
Born in Isfahan, Sarlak joined the academy of Sepahan in 2010. He was promoted to the first team in 2014 and made his professional debut on 10 December 2014, at the age of 19, in a 4–1 win against Gostaresh Foolad. Sarlak became a regular member of the starting 11 in the 2016–17 season.

Sarlak scored his first professional goal on 2 February 2017 in a 3–2 loss to Paykan.

Persepolis 
On 5 September 2020, Sarlak signed a two-year contract with Persian Gulf Pro League champions Persepolis.

International career

He made his debut on 11 June 2021 against Cambodia.

Club career statistics

International
.

Honours

Club
Sepahan
Persian Gulf Pro League (1): 2014–15

Persepolis
Persian Gulf Pro League (1): 2020–21
Iranian Super Cup (1): 2020 ; Runner-up: 2021
AFC Champions League Runner-up: 2020

References

External links
 Milad Sarlak at eurosport
 Milad Sarlak at Fmdataba
 
 Milad Sarlak at PersianLeague.com
 

Sepahan S.C. footballers
1995 births
Living people
Sportspeople from Isfahan
Iran under-20 international footballers
Iran international footballers
Iranian footballers
Association football midfielders
Nassaji Mazandaran players
Persepolis F.C. players
Persian Gulf Pro League players